The Blue Picardy Spaniel (or Épagneul Bleu de Picardie) is a breed of Spaniel originating in France, from the area around the mouth of the River Somme, around the start of the 20th century. It is descended from Picardy Spaniels and English Setters, and is described as a quiet breed that requires much exercise due to its stamina. It is especially good with children. Similar to the Picardy Spaniel, it has a distinctive coloured coat. Recognised by only a handful of kennel associations, the breed is predominantly known in France and Canada.

Description

Appearance 
Its coat is speckled grey black forming a bluish shade, with some black patches. The coat is flat or a little wavy with feathering on the ears, legs, underside and tail. It has long legs with some setter characteristics.

It has a long broad nose and muzzle, with thick ears covered in silky hair that usually end around the tip of the muzzle. Its chest is of medium size that descends down to the same level as the elbows. Both the forequarters and the hindquarters are well muscled. Its tail typically does not extend beyond the hock and is normally straight.

The breed has many similarities with the Picardy Spaniel due to the two breeds' recent history. The Blue Spaniel is described as being softer, as well as the obvious difference in coat color. The Picardy has a brown coat, whereas the Blue Picardy has a black and grey coat, which was brought into the breed by the introduction of English Setter blood. Similar in the modern era due to the close similarities of the two different breed standards. In addition, the Blue Picardy is a little faster, and has a slightly finer nose.

Temperament 

It is a versatile hunting dog, used for its ability to locate and retrieve game in harsh and adverse terrain and conditions. It is not specialised to any one type of terrain, and tends to score well in field trials. The Blue Picardy is considered to be a quiet breed, but it requires a great deal of exercise, as it has a high level of stamina. It loves to play and is a responsive and obedient breed which thrives on human companionship. It is especially good with children.

Health 

The breed has no known genetic health issues. Blue Picardy Spaniels can be prone to ear infections, which are common among dogs with pendulous ears, including Basset Hounds and other breeds of Spaniel. It has an average life expectancy of thirteen years.

History 

At the turn of the 20th century the area around the mouth of the River Somme was considered a paradise for hunters interested in wildfowl. Because of quarantine restrictions in the United Kingdom, British shooters would board their dogs in the Picardy area, near the mouth of the Somme. This caused the infusion of English Setter blood into the local Spaniel population and developed the Blue Picardy Spaniel.

While the first black, blue-grey Spaniel was recorded in 1875, it was not until 1904 when the Picardy Spaniel was first shown. This Spaniel was officially classified as a French Spaniel, and was shown at the Paris Canine Exposition. When the Picard Spaniel and Blue Picardy Spaniel Club was formed in 1907, the two different breeds of Picardy Spaniel were categorised.

In France, the Blue Picardy was recognised as a separate breed in 1938. About 1,000 Blue Picardy Spaniel puppies are born in France each year. The first person to import the Blue Picardy Spaniel into Canada was Ronald Meunier of Saint-Julien, Quebec, around 1987, and the breed was then recognised by the Canadian Kennel Club effective 1 June 1995. The breed is recognised by the American Rare Breed Association, which uses the same standard as the Fédération Cynologique Internationale.

References

External links 

 Espagneuls Picards, Bleus de Picardie & Pont Audemer Club (In French)
 Nederlandse Vereniging Epagneul Bleu de Picardie (In Dutch)

FCI breeds
Dog breeds originating in France
Gundogs
Pointers
Spaniels
Rare dog breeds